William Henry Arch (29 November 1894 – December, 1978) was an English professional footballer who played as a full-back.

References

1894 births
1978 deaths
Sportspeople from Tipton
English footballers
Association football fullbacks
West Bromwich Albion F.C. players
Newport County A.F.C. players
Willenhall F.C. players
Grimsby Town F.C. players
Hartlepool United F.C. players
Bilston Town F.C. players
English Football League players